Judo is a sport which is widely played in India. The first written record of judo in India refers to demonstrations and coaching by Japanese judoka Shinzo Takagaki in Shantiniketan, arranged by Rabindranath Tagore in 1929. The Judo Federation of India was formed in 1965.

In the 2010 Judo World Cup in Tashkent, Thoudam Kalpana Devi of Manipur became the first Indian to win a World Cup top-three finish. 

Other notable Indian Judokas include Narendra Singh, Cawas Billimoria, Poonam Chopra Akram Shah, Angom Anita Chanu, Khumujam Tombi Devi, Avtar Singh, Garima Chaudhary.

Total medals won by Indian Judo Players in Major tournaments

See also
Judo by country

References

External links
 Judo Federation of India

Sport in India by sport
Judo in India